Recycling can be carried out on various raw materials. Recycling is an important part of creating more sustainable economies, reducing the cost and environmental impact of raw materials. Not all materials are easily recycled, and processing recyclable into the correct waste stream requires considerable energy. Some particular manufactured goods are not easily separated, unless specially process therefore have unique product-based recycling processes.

Asphalt

Asphalt concrete removed during road maintenance, resurfacing, and repair activities can be reclaimed and reused in new pavement mixtures, as an unbound aggregate base, or other civil engineering applications. Very little asphalt concrete — less than 1 percent, according to a survey by the Federal Highway Administration and the National Asphalt Pavement Association conducted annually since 2009 — is actually disposed of in landfills. When asphalt pavement material is reclaimed for reuse, it is able to replace both virgin aggregates and virgin asphalt binder. Similarly, asphalt roof shingles can be recycled for use in new asphalt pavements.

Concrete

Glass

Metals

Aluminium

Aluminium is one of the most efficient and widely recycled materials. Aluminium is shredded and ground into small pieces or crushed into bales. These pieces or bales are melted in an aluminium smelter to produce molten aluminium. By this stage, the recycled aluminium is indistinguishable from virgin aluminium and further processing is identical for both. This process does not produce any change in the metal, so aluminium can be recycled indefinitely.

Recycling aluminium saves 95% of the energy cost of processing new aluminium. This is because the temperature necessary for melting recycled, nearly pure, aluminium is 600 °C, while to extract mined aluminium from its ore requires 900 °C. To reach this higher temperature, much more energy is needed, leading to the high environmental benefits of aluminium recycling. Americans throw away enough aluminium every year to rebuild their entire commercial air fleet. Also, the energy saved by recycling one aluminium can is enough to run a television for three hours.

Copper

Iron and steel

Iron and steel are the world's most recycled materials, and among the easiest materials to reprocess, as they can be separated magnetically from the waste stream. Recycling is via a steelworks: scrap is either remelted in an electric arc furnace (90-100% scrap), or used as part of the charge in a Basic Oxygen Furnace (around 25% scrap). Any grade of steel can be recycled to top quality new metal, with no 'downgrading' from prime to lower quality materials as steel is recycled repeatedly. 42% of crude steel produced is recycled material.

Other metals
For information about recycling other, less common metals, refer to:

Bismuth recycling
Lead recycling

Plastic

Timber

Recycling timber has become popular due to its image as an environmentally friendly product, with consumers commonly believing that by purchasing recycled wood the demand for green timber will fall and ultimately benefit the environment. Greenpeace also view recycled timber as an environmentally friendly product, citing it as the most preferable timber source on their website. The arrival of recycled timber as a construction product has been important in both raising industry and consumer awareness towards deforestation and promoting timber mills to adopt more environmentally friendly practices.

See also

Index of recycling topics

References